V. Thomas Wilson White (September 1896 – 1960) was an English professional footballer who played in the Football League for Birmingham and Newport County. He played as a full back.

White was born in West Bromwich, Staffordshire. He joined Birmingham in March 1918, and played a few games in the wartime leagues. He made his debut in the Second Division on 26 October 1919, in a 1–0 defeat at home to West Ham United, deputising for Billy Ball who had been injured playing for England in a Victory international. White, described as a "slow, cumbersome defender who relied on the big clearance", lost any hope of a first-team place with the arrival of Jack Jones in the 1920 close season, and he left for Worksop Town in January 1921. He contributed to their Midland League title in 1922, and earned himself a return to the Football League with Newport County later that year. White made 44 appearances in the Third Division South for Newport before finishing off his career with Kidderminster Harriers of the Birmingham & District League.

White died in Wednesbury, Staffordshire, in 1960 aged about 63.

References

External links
 Newport County team photos including Tom White

1896 births
1960 deaths
Sportspeople from West Bromwich
English footballers
Association football fullbacks
Notts County F.C. players
Birmingham City F.C. players
Worksop Town F.C. players
Newport County A.F.C. players
Kidderminster Harriers F.C. players
English Football League players
Midland Football League players